The 2013 Kazakhstan Super Cup was the fifth Kazakhstan Super Cup, an annual football match played between the winners of the previous season's Premier League, Shakhter Karagandy, and the previous season's Kazakhstan Cup, Astana, with the Shakhter Karagandy winning 3–2. This was both teams second appearance in the Kazakhstan Super Cup.

Match details

See also
2012 Kazakhstan Premier League
2012 Kazakhstan Cup

References

FC Shakhter Karagandy matches
FC Astana matches
2013
Supercup